Eupithecia biviridata is a moth in the  family Geometridae. It is found in the Himalaya.

References

Moths described in 1896
biviridata
Moths of Asia